Karl Schwarzböck (born 3 November 1929) is an Austrian bobsledder. He competed in the four-man event at the 1956 Winter Olympics.

References

External links
 

1929 births
Possibly living people
Austrian male bobsledders
Olympic bobsledders of Austria
Bobsledders at the 1956 Winter Olympics
Place of birth missing (living people)